Lyle Phair (born August 31, 1961) is a former professional ice hockey player who played three season for the Los Angeles Kings in the National Hockey League.

Phair was born in Pilot Mound, Manitoba.

Career statistics

Awards and honors

References

External links
 

1961 births
Living people
Los Angeles Kings players
Michigan State Spartans men's ice hockey players
New Haven Nighthawks players
People from Pilot Mound, Manitoba
Canadian ice hockey left wingers
Selkirk Steelers players
Utica Devils players
Undrafted National Hockey League players